Fenwick Island may refer to:
 Fenwick Island (Delaware–Maryland), an Atlantic Ocean barrier island
 Fenwick Island, Delaware, a town
 Fenwick Island Light, a lighthouse at the Delaware-Maryland border
 Fenwick Island State Park, a park in Delaware